Jacob Houck Jr. (January 14, 1801 – October 2, 1857) was an American lawyer and politician who served one term as a U.S. Representative from New York from 1841 to 1843.

Biography 
Born in Schoharie, New York, Houck attended the common schools.
He was graduated from Union College, Schenectady, New York, in 1822.
He studied law.
He was admitted to the bar and practiced in Schoharie.

He served as district attorney of Schoharie County 1831–1836.

Congress 
Houck was elected as a Democrat to the Twenty-seventh Congress (March 4, 1841 – March 3, 1843).

Later career and death 
He resumed the practice of law.

He died in Schoharie, New York, October 2, 1857.
He was interred in Lutheran Cemetery.

Sources

1801 births
1857 deaths
Union College (New York) alumni
Democratic Party members of the United States House of Representatives from New York (state)
People from Schoharie, New York
19th-century American politicians